Anaerobiospirillum is a genus of Gram-negative anaerobic bacteria recognized as human flora in human gastrointestinal tract, mainly in the human feces.

References

Gram-negative bacteria
Aeromonadales